Blood Stained Tradewinds is a 1990 Hong Kong action film directed by Chor Yuen and starring Waise Lee, Idy Chan, Alex Fong and Carrie Ng.

Plot
Sing (Alex Fong) and Hung (Waise Lee) grew up in a triad gang where they developed a great relationship with Uncle Lung's (Pau Fong) daughter Sophia (Idy Chan). Due to his old age and sickness, Lung decides to choose Sing as his successor. However, Sing refuses the offer and is kicked out of the gang. In his place, Lung chooses Hung as his successor and also arranges his marriage to Sophia.

Although Hung is now gang leader, he is unable to convince others to follow him due to his aggressiveness. At the same time, the Japanese yakuza attacks him. Meanwhile, Sing, who is now employed by a firecracker factory, has married Fong (Carrie Ng) and settled down to a peaceful life with her. However, a rival gang forces Sing to return to the underworld. The gang kills Lung and kidnaps Sophia triggering a massive gang war.

Cast

 Waise Lee as Hung
 Idy Chan as Sophia Chow
 Alex Fong as Chan Chi-sing
 Carrie Ng as Fong
 Ng Man-tat as Uncle Tat
 Lo Lieh as Brother Ming
 Chen Kuan-tai as Arms buyer
 Stanley Fung as Drunk
 Pau Fong as Uncle Lung
 Ng Yuen-jun as Gutsy Chao
 Ricky Wong as Wai
 Lam Wai as Sung Poon
 Andrew Chan
 Tang Cheung as Chung Yee Gang Lieutenant 
 Chan Chi-hung as Chung Yee Gang Lieutenant 
 Tam Wai-man as Ming's thug
 Kuk Hin-chiu as Ming's thug
 Yee Tin-hung as Ming's thug
 Lam Chi-tai as Ming's thug
 Lee Fat-yuen as Ming's thug
 Cheung Kwok-wah as Ming's thug
 Choi Kwok-keung
 Fei Kin
 Jack Wong
 Chung Wing
 Chang Sing-kwong
 Lam Foo-wai
 Wong Chi-ming
 Lee Yiu-king
 Lau Shung-fung
 Kong Chuen
 Ho Wing-cheung
 Yiu Man-kei
 Ho Hon-chau
 Choi Kwok-ping
 Chan Wai-to
 Ma Yuk-sing

Box office
The film grossed HK$1,815,249 at the Hong Kong box office during its theatrical run from 7 to 14 December 1990 in Hong Kong, and was released on DVD 16 January 2007.

Reception
DVD Talk offered that while this is a Chor Yuen film, it is not one to watch in order to best know the work of Yuen, as the film would not give a viewer a look into the director's vision, just as watching Jack does not allow insights into the brilliance of Francis Ford Coppola. After leaving the Shaw Bros., Yuen was working under constraints different from his earlier films. "Despite a decent cast and an okay script, Chor Yuen doesnt seem to muster much inventiveness of energy into the picture, so the result is a pretty paint by numbers entry into the gangsters and guns genre. "

References

External links
 
 Blood Stained Tradewind at Hong Kong Cinemagic
 
 Blood Stained Tradewinds at Rotten Tomatoes

1990 films
1990 action thriller films
1990 crime thriller films
Hong Kong action thriller films
Hong Kong crime thriller films
Gun fu films
Triad films
Yakuza films
1990s Cantonese-language films
Films directed by Chor Yuen
Films set in Hong Kong
Films shot in Hong Kong
1990s Japanese films
1990s Hong Kong films